This is a list of Swiss football transfers winter 2015–16, only the Swiss Super League and the Swiss Challenge League are included

Swiss Super League
Note: Flags indicate national team as has been defined under FIFA eligibility rules. Players may hold more than one non-FIFA nationality.

Basel

In:

Out:

Grasshopper

In:

Out:

Lugano

In:

Out:

Luzern

In:

Out:

Sion

In:

Out:

St. Gallen

In:

Out:

Thun

In:

Out:

Vaduz

In:

Out:

Young Boys

In:

Out:

Zürich

In:

Out:

Swiss Challenge League
Note: Flags indicate national team as has been defined under FIFA eligibility rules. Players may hold more than one non-FIFA nationality.

Aarau

In:

Out:

Biel-Bienne

In:

Out:

Chiasso

In:

Out:

Lausanne-Sport

In:

Out:

Le Mont

In:

Out:

Neuchâtel Xamax

In:

Out:

Schaffhausen

In:

Out:

Wil

In:

Out:

Winterthur

In:

Out:

Wohlen

In:

Out:

References

Transfers
Switzerland
2015–16